Tim Söderlund (born 23 January 1998) is a Swedish professional ice hockey forward for BK Mladá Boleslav of the Czech Extraliga (ELH). He was selected by the Chicago Blackhawks in the fourth round (112th overall) of the 2017 NHL Entry Draft. Söderlund previously played with Skellefteå AIK, Frölunda HC and Djurgårdens IF of the Swedish Hockey League (SHL).

Playing career
Born in Skellefteå, Sweden, Söderlund played junior hockey, with local team Skellefteå AIK. In 2011–12, he debuted at the under-16 level as a 14-year-old, playing three games in the J16 SM. The following season he dressed for 19 U-18 games playing for Clemensnäs HC, recording 3 goals and 8 assists. He also competed with a regional all-star team from Västerbotten in the annual TV-pucken, an under-15 national tournament, and notched one goal and one assists over eight games.

In 2013–14, Söderlund moved on to Luleå HF's J20 SuperElit team at 15 years old, appearing in 30 games. In 2013, Söderlund once again participated in the TV-pucken, playing for Norrbotten. He appeared in five games throughout the tournament and recorded 1 goal and 4 assists.  After impressive performances in the J20 SuperElit, with both Skellefteå AIK and Luleå HF; Söderlund played 8 games in Sweden's top-flight SHL.

On 24 June 2017, Söderlund was drafted by the Chicago Blackhawks during the 2017 NHL Entry Draft.

On 27 April 2018, Söderlund was signed by fellow SHL outfit, Frölunda HC. In the 2018–19 season, following 26 games with Frölunda where Söderlund scored 5 points, he returned to Skellefteå for the remainder of the campaign on 2 January 2019.

On 6 May 2019, Söderlund signed a three-year, entry-level contract with the Chicago Blackhawks.

Prior to the 2020–21 season, with the North America season delayed due to the COVID-19 pandemic, Söderlund was loaned to Swedish second tiered club, Almtuna IS, on 2 September 2020.

On 12 July 2021, Söderlund was traded to the Edmonton Oilers, along with Duncan Keith, in exchange for Caleb Jones and a conditional third-round pick in 2022. In the  season, Söderlund split time between the Oilers AHL and ECHL affiliates in the Bakersfield Condors and the Wichita Thunder. Unable to make an impact at the AHL level, Söderlund was placed on unconditional waivers by the Oilers and after clearing he opted to mutually terminate the remainder of his contract in order to return to Sweden on 22 January 2022. He immediately agreed to a contract for the remainder of the season with Djurgårdens IF of the SHL.

With Djurgårdens relegated to the HockeyAllsvenskan for the 2022–23 season, Söderlund continued with the club and registered 4 goals and 14 points through 29 regular season games. On 2 January 2023, Söderlund left Sweden in order to attain a bigger role, and joined Czech club, BK Mladá Boleslav of the ELH, for the remainder of the season.

Personal life
Tim Söderlund has an older sister named Fanny and his parents names are Ted and Katarina.

Career statistics

Regular season and playoffs

International

References

External links

1998 births
Living people
Almtuna IS players
Bakersfield Condors players
BK Mladá Boleslav players
Chicago Blackhawks draft picks
Djurgårdens IF Hockey players
Frölunda HC players
Indy Fuel players
Rockford IceHogs (AHL) players
People from Skellefteå Municipality
Skellefteå AIK players
Swedish ice hockey forwards
Wichita Thunder players
Sportspeople from Västerbotten County
Swedish expatriate ice hockey players in the United States
Swedish expatriate sportspeople in the Czech Republic
Expatriate ice hockey players in the Czech Republic